The Southern Federal District is one of the eight federal districts of Russia. Its territory lies mostly on the Pontic–Caspian steppe of southern Russia. The Southern Federal District shares borders with Ukraine, the Azov Sea, and the Black Sea in the west, and Kazakhstan and the Caspian Sea  in the east.

History

The Southern Federal District was originally called the North Caucasian Federal District when it was founded in May 2000, but was renamed for political reasons on 21 June 2000. On 19 January 2010, the Southern Federal District was split in two, with its former southern territories forming a new North Caucasian Federal District.

On 28 July 2016 Crimean Federal District (which contains the Republic of Crimea and the Federal city of Sevastopol) was abolished and merged into Southern Federal District in order to "improve the governance". Crimean Federal District was established on 21 March 2014 after the annexation of Crimea by the Russian Federation. The federal district includes both the Republic of Crimea and the federal city of Sevastopol, both recognized as part of Ukraine by most of the international community. Ukraine considers the area, along with the areas of Luhansk People's Republic, the Donetsk People's Republic, Kherson Oblast and Zaporizhzhia Oblast, as temporarily occupied territories.

Demographics

Federal constituent entities

An official government translation of the constitution of Russia from Russian to English uses the term "constituent entities of the Russian Federation". For example, Article 5 reads: "The Russian Federation shall consist of republics, krays, oblasts, cities of federal significance, an autonomous oblast and autonomous okrugs, which shall have equal rights as constituent entities of the Russian Federation." A translation provided by Garant-Internet instead uses the term "subjects of the Russian Federation".

Tom Fennell, a translator, told the 2008 American Translators Association conference that "constituent entity of the Russian Federation" is a better translation than "subject". This was supported by Tamara Nekrasova, Head of Translation Department at Goltsblat BLP, saying in a 2011 presentation at a translators conference that "constituent entity of the Russian Federation is more appropriate than subject of the Russian Federation (subject would be OK for a monarchy)".

Ethnic groups 
Ethnic composition, according to the 2010 census: Total - 13 854 334 people.
Russians - 11,602,452 (83.75%)
Armenians - 442,505 (3.19%)
Ukrainians - 212 674 (1.54%)
Kazakhs - 205 364 (1.48%)
Kalmyks - 172,242 (1.24%)
Tatars - 127,455 (0.92%)
Adyghe (Circassian) - 121 391 (0.88%)
Azerbaijanis - 52 871 (0.38%)
Turks - 51,367 (0.37%)
Roma - 46,067 (0.33%)
Belarusians - 44 723 (0.32%)
Chechens - 34,593 (0.25%)
Georgians - 31,018 (0.22%)
Germans - 29 312 (0.21%)
Koreans - 27,640 (0.20%)
Greeks - 27,313 (0.20%)
Dargins - 24 815 (0.18%)
Uzbeks - 16 361 (0.12%)
Avars - 16,061 (0.12%)
Moldovans - 15 888 (0.11%)
Lezgins - 15 241 (0.11%)
Chuvash - 12 329 (0.09%)
Kurds - 12,056 (0.09%)
Bashkirs - 4 942 (0.06%)
Persons who did not indicate their nationality: 240 609 people. (1.74%)
Representatives of other nationalities: 729,572 people. (5.26%)

Life expectancy

Presidential plenipotentiary envoys 
Viktor Kazantsev (18 May 2000 – 9 March 2004)
Vladimir Yakovlev (9 March 2004 – 13 September 2004)
Dmitry Kozak (13 September 2004 – 24 September 2007)
Grigory Rapota (24 September 2007 – 14 May 2008)
Vladimir Ustinov (14 May 2008 – present)

References

External links

Southern Federal District
News and events of Russian South

 
Federal districts of Russia
Geography of Southern Russia
States and territories established in 2000
2000 establishments in Russia